Frederick O. Thorpe was a member of the Wisconsin State Senate. In historical documents he was sometimes referred to as "F. O. Thorpe" and his last name was sometimes spelled "Thorp". Thorpe represented the 4th District during the 1862, 1863, 1864, 1865, 1866, and 1867 sessions. He was a Democrat. He was elected President pro tempore of the Wisconsin Senate for the regular session of 1862.

In 1870, Thorpe was appointed as a Regent of the University of Wisconsin.

References

Democratic Party Wisconsin state senators
Year of birth missing
Year of death missing